Since 1927, Australia and Ireland have competed against each other in rugby union in thirty-seven matches, Australia having won twenty-two, Ireland fourteen, with one draw. Their first meeting was on 12 November 1927, and was won 5–3 by Australia. Their most recent meeting took place at the Aviva Stadium, Dublin on 19 November 2022 and was won 13–10 by Ireland. 

Ireland have faced Australia five times in Rugby World Cup play, with Australia winning the first four before Ireland finally won in Eden Park in 2011.

Since 1999 the two sides have competed for the Lansdowne Cup. The Cup is currently held by Ireland on a run of three wins since defeating Australia in Melbourne in 2018.

Summary

Overall

Records
Note: Date shown in brackets indicates when the record was or last set.

Attendance
Up to date as of 19 November 2022

Results

List of series

Images

References

External links

 
Australia national rugby union team matches
Ireland national rugby union team matches
Rugby union rivalries in Ireland
Rugby union rivalries in Australia
Australia–Ireland relations
Irish-Australian culture